= Ambates =

Scientific classification
- Kingdom: Animalia
- Phylum: Arthropoda
- Clade: Pancrustacea
- Class: Insecta
- Order: Coleoptera
- Suborder: Polyphaga
- Infraorder: Cucujiformia
- Superfamily: Curculionoidea
- Family: Curculionidae
- Genus: Ambates; Schoenherr, C.J., 1835

Genus of weevils

Ambates is a genus of weevils. There are 113 species assigned to this genus.
